Coyote squash may refer to:
Chayote, a type of gourd
Cucurbita palmata, a type of squash